Alagappa Nagar is  situated at Amballur Village in Mukundapuram Taluk in Thrissur District in Kerala State. Alagappa Nagar is 12.7 km far from Thrissur city. It is 221 km far from the capital city of Thiruvananthapuram. There is a Textile Mill factory in this town named Alagappanagar Textile Mill Factory Originally build by Dr Alagappa Chettiar.
 
In 1937, Dr. Alagappa Chettiar started Cochin Textiles, later Alagappa Textiles at Amballur near Thrissur  in Kerala. The township for Cochin textile staff was named "Alagappa Nagar".

There is also a Polytechnic called Thiagarajar Polytechnic College having engineering departments of Electrical & Electronics, Mechanical and Civil Engineering.

References

Cities and towns in Thrissur district